The Leviathan, officially known as Central Pacific #63, was a 4-4-0 steam locomotive owned by the Central Pacific Railroad. It was notable for helping construct the First transcontinental railroad before hauling Leland Stanford's special train, which was then passed on to sister engine #60, the Jupiter, to take part in the railroad's completion in 1869.

The Leviathan was built in September 1868 by the Schenectady Locomotive Works in New York, along with four other identical engines, numbered 60, 61, 62, and 84, respectively named the Jupiter, Storm, Whirlwind, and Gazelle. These were dismantled and sailed to San Francisco, California, before being sent to the Central Pacific headquarters in Sacramento for reassembly. They were all commissioned into service on March 20, 1869.

Original engine 
The Leviathan was put to work in operating passenger, general goods, and construction trains on the farthest end of the Central Pacific Railroad’s line in Utah, just miles from the Union Pacific Railroad’s own end of line. One month after being commissioned into service, the Leviathan made history by hauling Governor Leland Stanford's special train to Camp Victory in Toano, Nevada, and from there, it was picked up by sister engine, the Jupiter and taken to the ceremony in Promontory.

After the ceremony, the Leviathan found itself in more regular usage on the Central Pacific. In the early 1870s, the railroad had gave up naming their engines, and the Leviathan name was dropped, and the engine was simply known as CP #63. When the Southern Pacific Railroad seized control of Central Pacific Railroad, CP #63 was renumbered and modified beyond recognition, including a conversion to burn coal instead of wood. The engine was scrapped around the turn of the 20th century, with its historical significance not recognized until decades later.

Replica engine 
Between 1999 and 2009, the Kloke Locomotive Works, run by Dave Kloke, constructed a full-size replica of the Leviathan, borrowing plans, research, blueprints, and patterns from the construction of the replica of the Jupiter by O'Connor Engineering, in order to match the specifications and details. The replica however was also fitted with modern-day features upon construction, including an oil bunker, a small headlight on the rear of the tender, air brakes, and a varnished wooden cab. The replica made its first public appearance at the 2009 train festival in Owosso, Michigan, being hosted by the Steam Railroading Institute. Since then, the replica of the Leviathan has visited various tourist railroads and museums across the Midwest and Eastern United States for special events, including the Saratoga and North Creek Railway in North Creek, New York, the Illinois Railway Museum in Union, Illinois, and the Age of Steam Roundhouse in Sugarcreek, Ohio.

In 2018, the Leviathan replica was acquired by the Stone Gable Estates, which opened both the Star Barn Complex and the Harrisburg, Lincoln and Lancaster Railroad in Elizabethtown, Pennsylvania. The Leviathan replica currently operates on the Elizabethtown line exclusively for special events, while being re-lettered as Pennsylvania Railroad 331, the locomotive that pulled President Abraham Lincoln's funeral train in 1865.

References 

Steam locomotives of the United States
Southern Pacific Railroad locomotives
4-4-0 locomotives
Individual locomotives of the United States
Schenectady Locomotive Works locomotives
Railway locomotives introduced in 1868
Scrapped locomotives
Standard gauge locomotives of the United States